Robert Lorenzo Dozier, Jr. (born November 6, 1985) is an American professional basketball player who last played for the Phoenix Pulse Fuel Masters of the Philippine Basketball Association (PBA).

College career
In the 2007–08 season, Dozier started in all games with Memphis, along with the Memphis Tigers' future NBA players Derrick Rose, Chris Douglas-Roberts, Joey Dorsey, and Antonio Anderson. He was a key part in the Tigers' 2008 success, which ended in a loss to the Kansas Jayhawks in the championship game of the 2008 NCAA Tournament.

Professional career
Dozier was the last player drafted in the 2009 NBA Draft, selected 60th overall pick by the Miami Heat. He then signed a contract with the Greek League club Colossus Rhodes. In November 2010 he signed with PAOK B.C. In July 2011 he signed a one-year contract with Cholet Basket.

Dozier played for the Miami Heat in the 2012 NBA Summer League.

Dozier signed with the Miami Heat on September 27, 2012 but was waived by the team on October 21, 2012. Three weeks later, on November 7, 2012 he signed a one-month contract by Spanish squad Cajasol.

Dozier joined the Alaska Aces as its designated "import player" for the 2013 Commissioner's Cup season in the Philippine Basketball Association. Providing size and rebounding relief, he spurred an impressive postseason run for the Aces which culminated in a 3-game Finals sweep of the Barangay Ginebra Kings for the 2013 Commissioner's Cup Title. During Games 1 and 2 of the Finals, Dozier collected 42 combined rebounds and posted a game-high 27 points in the clincher while outdueling fellow American import Vernon Macklin in the championship round. He was named Best Import of Commissioners Cup on Game 3. He came back on the league for the same team at 2014 PBA Commissioner's Cup but they failed to defend their title.

In October 2014, he signed with Al Shabab Dubai of United Arab Emirates for the 2014–15 season.

On October 23, 2015, he signed with Le Mans Sarthe Basket of the French LNB Pro A. On December 28, 2015, he left Le Mans. On January 2, 2016, Dozier signed again with Alaska Aces as the team's import for the 2016 PBA Commissioner's Cup.

In August 2016, Dozier signed with SAN-EN NeoPhoenix of the Japanese B.League.

See also
 List of NCAA Division I men's basketball players with 145 games played

References

External links
Draftexpress.com Profile
NBADraft.net Profile
NBA.com Draft Profile
Memphis Tigers Profile

1985 births
Living people
Alaska Aces (PBA) players
American expatriate basketball people in France
American expatriate basketball people in Greece
American expatriate basketball people in Japan
American expatriate basketball people in the Philippines
American expatriate basketball people in the United Arab Emirates
American men's basketball players
Basketball players from Georgia (U.S. state)
Real Betis Baloncesto players
Cholet Basket players
Greek Basket League players
Iwate Big Bulls players
Kolossos Rodou B.C. players
Le Mans Sarthe Basket players
Liga ACB players
Memphis Tigers men's basketball players
Miami Heat draft picks
P.A.O.K. BC players
People from Lithonia, Georgia
Philippine Basketball Association imports
Phoenix Super LPG Fuel Masters players
Power forwards (basketball)
San-en NeoPhoenix players
Sportspeople from DeKalb County, Georgia